Agnippe separatella is a moth of the family Gelechiidae. It is found in southern Iran.

The name of the species reflects its distinctive genitalia and external characters, and separate position within the genus. It is derived from Latin separatus (meaning separate).

References

External links
 
 

Agnippe
moths described in 2010
moths of Asia